Guo Qiu (born 25 November 1995) is a Chinese field hockey player for the Chinese national team.

She participated at the 2018 Women's Hockey World Cup.

References

1995 births
Living people
Chinese female field hockey players